The Imperial Brewing Company Brewery is an abandoned Late Victorian/Romanesque Revival-style industrial site located at 2825 Southwest Boulevard in downtown Kansas City, Missouri. Built in 1902, the surviving brewhouse and stable were part of a larger complex developed by Ludwig D. Breitag, a German immigrant and stone contractor. An icehouse and other buildings in the complex were demolished when the site was converted to a flour mill during Prohibition. From 1919 until its closure in the mid-1980s, Imperial Brewery became commonly known as the Boulevard Mill. Although the existing structures have suffered from fires and vandalism, the footprint and integrity of the brewhouse and stable building are intact. The current owner of the property is seeking parties interested in redevelopment of the site.

References

Buildings and structures in Kansas City, Missouri